The 2014 Charlottesville Men's Pro Challenger was a professional tennis tournament played on indoor hard courts. It was the sixth edition of the tournament which was part of the 2014 ATP Challenger Tour, taking place in Charlottesville, United States from October 27 to November 2, 2014.

Singles main-draw entrants

Seeds

 1 Rankings are as of October 20, 2014.

Other entrants
The following players received wildcards into the singles main draw:
  Ernesto Escobedo
  Mitchell Frank
  Stefan Kozlov
  Mac Styslinger

The following players received entry from the qualifying draw:
  Kevin King
  Laurent Lokoli
  Daniel Nguyen
  Frederik Nielsen

Champions

Singles

 James Duckworth def.  Liam Broady, 5-7 6-3 6-2

Doubles

 Treat Huey /  Frederik Nielsen def.  Lewis Burton /  Marcus Willis, 3–6 6–3 [10–2]

Charlottesville Men's Pro Challenger
Charlottesville Men's Pro Challenger